Suwon Station is a railway station in the city of Suwon, South Korea. The station was completely redeveloped in 2002 and 2003, and is now integrated with the Aekyung Shopping Mall (AK Plaza). This station serves Inter-city railway Gyeongbu Line KTX, ITX-Saemaeul and Mugunghwa will stop. Also Line 1, Suin–Bundang Line of the Seoul subway will stop. And this station is an important hub in southern Gyeonggi Province.

Lines

Suwon is served by the following lines:

Korail
 Gyeongbu Line
  Line 1
  Suin–Bundang Line

Station layout

Korail platforms 
 Seoul Subway Line 1 · Gyeongbu Line platforms (Ground)

 Suin-Bundang Line platforms (underground)

History

Suwon Station opened on January 1, 1905. On December 1, 1930, the narrow gauge Suryeo Line from Suwon to Yeoju opened. On August 6, 1937, the Suin Line from Suwon to Incheon began operating services. Over three decades later, on April 1, 1972, the Suryeo Line closed, though two years later, on December 31, 1975, the Seoul Subway began services to Suwon. The Suin Line and narrow gauge services were both terminated on January 1, 1996.

Building

Suwon Station shares a building with AK Plaza. The station itself is above ground (for all services) and underground (for metro services only). There are many stores and restaurants located in the station and outside of the station. Also, there is Lotte Department Store back from the station. The mall consists of a shopping mall and the  Lotte Cinema theater. And there is Suwon Station Transit Center connected to Suwon station.

In a survey conducted in 2011 by the Ministry of Land, Transport and Maritime Affairs on 92 Administrative divisions across the country, it reported that the bus stop, near Suwon Railway Station and AK Plaza, was the most frequently used, with a daily average of 77,326 people boarding and 63,255 people alighting.

Surrounding area

West side
 Suwon Messe
 Lotte mall Suwon store (Lotte Department Store, Lotte Mart)

East side
 Suwon Station Rodeo Street
 AK Plaza
 Novotel Ambassador Suwon Hotel
 Gyeonggi-do Provincial Government

Gallery

References

Seoul Metropolitan Subway stations
Metro stations in Suwon
Railway stations in Gyeonggi Province
Railway stations in Korea opened in 1905
Korea Train Express stations
Gyeongbu Line
Suin Line
Bundang Line
Seoul Subway Line 1